"Nothing on You" is a song recorded by English singer-songwriter Ed Sheeran featuring Argentine rapper Paulo Londra and English rapper Dave from the former's compilation album, No.6 Collaborations Project (2019). It was released as a promotional single through Asylum and Atlantic Records on 12 July 2019. The song was written by Sheeran, Londra, Dave, Daniel Oviedo, Cristian Salazar, and Fred Gibson, and produced by Gibson and Sam Tsang.

Background
Sheeran announced the collaboration, as well as the entire album's tracklist, on 18 June 2019 via Instagram. Immediately following Sheeran's announcement, Londra shared the "crazy surprise" with his fans on social media, saying: "All I can say at this moment is that dreams do come true and thank you, Ed Sheeran, for giving me the opportunity to do what I do on his album."

As to how the collaboration came together, Londra revealed to Billboard that the album was already "closed", which meant the likelihood that a collaboration between Sheeran and him could appear on it was slim, but it ended up coming together just in time. For Londra, one of the main purposes of this collaboration was to inspire other Latin artists to dream big.

Composition
The track starts with a melodic line of a synthesizer that is repeated during the three-minutes twenty-seconds of the song, acting as its leitmotif. After its first verse and chorus, with Sheeran commanding, Londra attacks the beat. Its entrance to the melodic base denotes the work of a professional rapper. Londra's flow is closed by Dave for Sheeran, with his melodic cadence, to put an end to the song.

Critical reception
Jota Ayerza of Billboard Argentina highlighted Londra's performance, saying: "It seems like if the Córdoba-born singer has been preparing for this moment since his days as freestyler, without even knowing it."

Music video
The accompanying music video for "Nothing on You" was released on 8 August 2019.

Charts

Certifications

References

External links
 
 

2019 songs
Ed Sheeran songs
British hip hop songs
Dave (rapper) songs
Paulo Londra songs
Songs written by Dave (rapper)
Songs written by Ed Sheeran
Songs written by Fred Again